Isabel Rocio Tábora is the Honduran politician. She was the Minister of Finance and Economic Regulations from 2018 to 2020.

References

Living people
Year of birth missing (living people)
Finance Ministers of Honduras
Women government ministers of Honduras
Female finance ministers
21st-century Honduran women politicians
21st-century Honduran politicians